Barda is a rural locality (a selo) and the administrative center of Bardymsky District of Perm Krai, Russia.

History
It was first mentioned in 1740. In 1750, the first mosque was built; the first madrasa (Muslim school) was registered in 1760.

Demographics
In 1834, 223 Bashkirs and tatars in 34 households lived in Barda. Presently most of the population is of Bashkir and Tatar ethnicities.

References

Notes

Sources

Rural localities in Bardymsky District
Osinsky Uyezd